Rauli Raitanen (born 14 January 1970) is a retired Finnish ice hockey player. He was drafted by Winnipeg Jets (9th round, 182nd overall) in 1990 NHL Entry Draft.

International career 
Raitanen played a total 33 internationals for the Finland national ice hockey team. He was a member of the Finland squad in the 1992 World Ice Hockey Championships.

Personal life 
Rauli Raitanen is the father of the footballer Patrik Raitanen who plays for Fortuna Sittard.

Career statistics

References 

1970 births
Living people
Sportspeople from Pori
Finnish ice hockey right wingers
Ässät players
Tappara players
Modo Hockey players
Växjö Lakers players
Winnipeg Jets (1979–1996) draft picks